Isaac Gray Farlee (May 18, 1787 – January 12, 1855) was a U.S. Representative from New Jersey for one term from 1843 to 1845.

Biography
Born in the Whitehouse section of Readington Township, New Jersey, Farlee attended the public schools.

He engaged in mercantile pursuits in Flemington. He served as member of the New Jersey General Assembly in 1819, 1821, 1828, and 1830 and served as clerk of Hunterdon County from 1830 to 1840, and was a Brigadier general of the State militia.

Farlee was elected as a Democrat to the Twenty-eighth Congress, serving in office from March 4, 1843 to March 3, 1845, but was an unsuccessful candidate for reelection in 1844 to the Twenty-ninth Congress. He lost the 1844 race by just 16 votes and he contested the election on the grounds that enough Princeton students, who were ineligible due to residency, had voted to swing the election. While some on the committee agreed, his contest was narrowly decided against him in the full House.

He served as member of the New Jersey Senate from 1847 to 1849, and served as judge of the Court of Common Pleas from 1852 to 1855.

Death
He died in Flemington, New Jersey, January 12, 1855, and was interred there in Presbyterian Cemetery.

References

External links

1787 births
1855 deaths
Democratic Party members of the New Jersey General Assembly
Democratic Party New Jersey state senators
People from Flemington, New Jersey
People from Readington Township, New Jersey
Politicians from Hunterdon County, New Jersey
Democratic Party members of the United States House of Representatives from New Jersey
American militia generals
19th-century American politicians
Military personnel from New Jersey